Chen Zhuoxuan (born 13 August 1997) also known by her English name Krystal Chan is a Chinese actress and singer. She first appeared in the 2016 audition show Super Girl 2016, where she was awarded first in the Xi'an region and joined the Super Girls Group, subsequently finishing 15th nationally. Super Girl Group disbanded in 2017, and in the same year she played her first character, You You (幽幽) in the web-drama 《云客江湖》and participated in Sound of My Dream Season 2. Chen gained more popularity in 2019, as the minor character Ah Qing in The Untamed. In 2020, she participated in the survival show Produce Camp 2020, finishing fourth and debuting as the main vocalist of the girl group BonBon Girls 303. From then on, she has participated in various other shows both by herself and as a member of BonBon Girls 303. Her fandom name is Xuanfeng (璇风).

Early life 
Chen Zhuoxuan was born in Guiyang, Guizhou, China, and studied and graduated from Shanghai Maritime University as an English Language Major. She was the Class President of English Class 156, and as a Freshman gave a speech at the School Opening Ceremony in 2015. She also was the champion of the school's 28th Freshman Singing Competition, and won many prizes in her university days, including Most Popular in the Freshman Hosting Competition.

Discography

Extended Plays

Singles

Soundtrack Appearances

Collaborative Singles

Filmography

Television series

Variety and Reality Shows

Media

Advertisements and Endorsements

Magazine Appearances

Notes

References

External links
 

1997 births
Living people
People from Guiyang
Chinese women singers
Chinese television actresses
BonBon Girls 303 members
Chinese Mandopop singers
Produce 101 (Chinese TV series) contestants
Reality show winners